Saharpada is a village located in Kendujhar district in Odisha. Aharpada, Bhaliadiha, Haladibata are nearby villages to Saharpada. The PIN Code of Saharpada is 758016.

References

Villages in Kendujhar district